The 2012 Belgian Super Cup is a football match that was played on 22 July 2012, between 2011–12 Belgian Pro League winners Anderlecht and 2011–12 Belgian Cup winners Lokeren.

In a dull first half without many chances, Anderlecht took the lead after 25 minutes when Dennis Praet scored the opening goal. Anderlecht had possession, but was not able to create any chances, while Hamdi Harbaoui almost equalized before half time.

Immediately after the break, Jérémy Taravel was wearing the wrong tape around his ankles and asked to change it by the referee, while play continued. Anderlecht used the extra man situation, allowing Dieumerci Mbokani to head in the 2-0. Lokeren coach Peter Maes was furious with Taravel, but could smile again soon after as Ivan Leko lobbed the ball into the Anderlecht goal. On the hour mark, Leko scored the equalizing goal, although Harbaoui had touched the ball with his hands during the play, without being noticed by the referee. Anderlecht then again took control of the match and scored the 3-2 winner 15 minutes from the end through Guillaume Gillet, who shot the ball perfectly into the top corner of the goal. Lokeren was unable to score thereafter, with Anderlecht coming close to a fourth goal as Mbokani hit the post. It stayed 3-2, allowing Anderlecht to win their 10th Belgian Supercup trophy.

Match details

References

See also
Belgian Supercup

Belgian Super Cup 2012
Belgian Super Cup 2012
Belgian Super Cup, 2012
Belgian Supercup
July 2012 sports events in Europe